Stapp may refer to 
Stapp (surname)
Stapp's ironical paradox by Colonel John Paul Stapp
 Stapp, Kentucky, an unincorporated community in the U.S.
 Stapp, Oklahoma, an unincorporated community in the U.S.
Leive, Parks and Stapp Opera House in  Indiana, U.S.
Stapp's Circle S Ranch in  Indiana, U.S.